BSE Limited, also known as the Bombay Stock Exchange (BSE), is an Indian stock exchange which is located on Dalal Street in Mumbai. Established in 1875 by cotton merchant Premchand Roychand, a Jain businessman, it is the oldest stock exchange in Asia, and also the tenth oldest in the world. The BSE is one of the world's largest stock exchange by market capitalization. 

The Economic Times estimates that as of April 2018, 6 crore (60 million) retail investors had invested their savings in stocks in India, either through direct purchases of equities or through mutual funds. Earlier, the Bimal Jalan Committee report estimated that barely 3% of India's population invested in the stock market, as compared to 27% in the United States and 10% in China.

History
Bombay Stock Exchange was started by Premchand Roychand in 1875. While BSE Limited is now synonymous with Dalal Street, it was not always so. In the 1850s, five stock brokers gathered together under a Banyan tree in front of Mumbai Town Hall, where Horniman Circle is now situated. A decade later, the brokers moved their location to another leafy setting, this time under banyan trees at the junction of Meadows Street and what was then called Esplanade Road, now Mahatma Gandhi Road. With a rapid increase in the number of brokers, they had to shift places repeatedly. At last, in 1874, the brokers found a permanent location, the one that they could call their own. The brokers group became an official organization known as "The Native Share & Stock Brokers Association" in 1875.

On 12 March 1993, a car bomb exploded in the basement of the building during the 1993 Bombay bombings. The BSE is also a Partner Exchange of the United Nations Sustainable Stock Exchange initiative, joining in September 2012. BSE established India INX on 30 December 2016. India INX is the first international exchange of India. BSE became the first stock exchange in the country to launch commodity derivatives contract in gold and silver in October 2018.

BSE was demutualized and corporatized on 19 May 2007, pursuant to the BSE (Corporatization and Demutualization) Scheme, 2005 notified by SEBI. It was listed on NSE on 3 February 2017.

Criticism and controversies

A number of corruption scandals, including the 1992 Indian stock market scam and others, have rocked the Indian stock exchanges. At various times, numerous Indian corporate groups have been charged with stock manipulation.

See also 

 Economy of India 
 List of stock exchanges 
 National Stock Exchange of India
 Stock market crashes in India 
 List of stock market crashes and bear markets 
 Trading day 
 Muhurat trading 
 Clause 49 
 Securities and Exchange Board of India

References

Notes

Citations

External links

 

 
 

 
Financial services companies established in 1875
Stock exchanges in India
Financial services companies based in Mumbai
Indian companies established in 1875
Companies listed on the National Stock Exchange of India